Annabelle Euranie (born 4 September 1982 in Gonesse, France) is a French judoka who competed at the 2004 Summer Olympics in the women's half-lightweight division.

References

External links
 

French female judoka
Olympic judoka of France
Judoka at the 2004 Summer Olympics
French people of Martiniquais descent
1982 births
Living people
European Games gold medalists for France
European Games silver medalists for France
European Games medalists in judo
Judoka at the 2015 European Games
Mediterranean Games gold medalists for France
Mediterranean Games medalists in judo
Competitors at the 2005 Mediterranean Games
21st-century French women
20th-century French women